Mossat is a settlement in Aberdeenshire, Scotland on the A97 road near Glenkindie and Lumsden, between Bridge of Alford and Strathdon, and is situated on the Mossat Burn. Mossat has a garden centre, cafe and antique shop.

External links

References 

Villages in Aberdeenshire